Charcas is a province in the northern parts of the Bolivian Potosí Department. Its capital is San Pedro de Buena Vista (955 inhabitants in 2001).

Location
Charcas province is one of sixteen provinces in the Potosí Department. It is located between 17° 57' und 18° 36' South and between 65° 21' und 66° 19' West. It borders Bernardino Bilbao Province in the north, Alonso de Ibáñez Province in the northwest, Rafael Bustillo Province in the southwest, Chayanta Province in the south, and Cochabamba Department in the east.

The province extends over 125 km from East to West and 100 km from north to south.

Division
The province comprises two municipalities which are further subdivided into cantons.

Population
The main language of the province is Quechua, spoken by 98%, while 34% of the population speak Spanish. The population increased from 31,233 inhabitants (1992 census) to 38,174 (2001 census), an increase of 22.3%. Capital of the province is San Pedro (955 inhabitants).

10% of the population have no access to electricity, 10% have no sanitary facilities. 72.0% of the population are employed in agriculture, 0.5% in mining, 12.2% in industry, 15.3% in general services. 99% of the population are Catholics.

The people are predominantly indigenous citizens of Quechua descent and descendents of the Spanish.

See also 
 Paka Chuku
 Puka Urqu
 Quri Kancha
 Toro Toro National Park

References 

 

Provinces of Potosí Department